= Constituency W-306 =

Provincial constituency of Punjab, Pakistan

W-306
- Woman Reserved constituency for the Provincial Assembly of Punjab

Current constituency

Constituency W-306 is a reserved constituency for women in the Provincial Assembly of Punjab.

== See also ==
- Punjab, Pakistan
